Nampeyo (1859 – 1942) was a Hopi-Tewa potter who lived on the Hopi Reservation in Arizona. Her Tewa name was also spelled Num-pa-yu, meaning "snake that does not bite". Her name is also cited as "Nung-beh-yong," Tewa for Sand Snake.

She used ancient techniques for making and firing pottery and used designs from "Old Hopi" pottery and sherds found at 15th-century Sikyátki ruins on First Mesa. Her artwork is in collections in the United States and Europe, including many museums like the National Museum of American Art, Museum of Northern Arizona, Spurlock Museum, and the Peabody Museum of Archaeology and Ethnology at Harvard University.

A world record for Southwest American Indian pottery was declared at Bonhams Auction House in San Francisco on December 6, 2010, when one of Nampeyo's art works, a decorated ceramic pot, sold for $350,000.

Early life

Nampeyo was born on First Mesa in the village of Hano, also known as Tewa Village which is primarily made up of descendants of the Tewa people from Northern New Mexico who fled west to Hopi lands about 1702 for protection from the Spanish after the Pueblo Revolt of 1680.  Her mother, White Corn was Tewa; her father Quootsva, from nearby Walpi, was a member of the Snake clan. According to tradition, Nampeyo was born into her mother's Tewa Corn clan. She had three older brothers, Tom Polacca, Kano, and Patuntupi, also known as Squash; Her brothers were born from about 1849 to 1858. Nampeyo could not read or write and never went to school.

William Henry Jackson first photographed her in 1875; she was reputedly one of the most photographed ceramic artists in the Southwest during the 1870s.

About 1878 or 1881, Nampeyo married her second husband, Lesou, a member of the Cedarwood clan at Walpi. Their first daughter, Annie, was born in 1884; William Lesso, was born about 1893; Nellie was born in 1896; Wesley in 1899; and Fannie was born in 1900.

Artwork

Hopi people make ceramics painted with beautiful designs, and Nampeyo was eventually considered one of the finest Hopi potters.  Nampeyo learned pottery making through the efforts of her paternal grandmother.  In the 1870s, she made a steady income by selling her work at a local trading post operated by Thomas Keam. By 1881 she was already known for her works of "old Hopi" pottery of Walpi.

She became increasingly interested in ancient pottery form and design, recognizing them as superior to Hopi pottery produced at the time.  Her second husband, Lesou (or Lesso) was reputedly employed by the archaeologist J. Walter Fewkes at the excavation of the prehistoric ruin of Sikyátki on the First Mesa of the Hano Pueblo in the 1890s. Lesou helped Nampeyo find potsherds with ancient designs which they copied onto paper and were later integrated into Nampeyo's pottery. However, she began making copies of protohistoric pottery from the 15th through 17th centuries from ancient village sites, such as Sikyátki, which was explored before Fewkes and Thomas Varker Keam. Nampeyo developed her own style based on the traditional designs, known as Hopi Revival pottery from old Hopi designs and Sikyátki pottery. This is why researchers refer to her style as Sikyatki Revival after the proto-historic site.

Keam hired First Mesa potters to make reproductions of the works. Nampeyo was particularly skilled. Her pottery became a success and was collected throughout the United States and in Europe.

Kate Cory, an artist and photographer who lived among the Hopi from 1905 to 1912 at Oraibi and Walpi, wrote that Nampeyo used sheep bones in the fire, which are believed to have made the fire hot or made the pottery whiter, and smoothed the fired pots with a plant with a red blossom. Both techniques are ancient Tewa pottery practices. Nampeyo used up to five different clays in one creation when the usual was two.

Nampeyo and her husband traveled to Chicago in 1898 to exhibit her pottery. Between 1905 and 1907, she produced and sold pottery out of a pueblo-like structure called Hopi House, a tourist attraction (combination of museum, curio shop, theatre, and living space for Native American dancers and artists) at the Grand Canyon lodge, operated by the Fred Harvey Company.  She exhibited in 1910 at the Chicago United States Land and Irrigation Exposition.

One of her famous patterns, the migration pattern, represented the migration of the Hopi people, with feather and bird-claw motifs. An example is a 1930s vase in the collection of the Smithsonian Institution's National Museum of the American Indian in Washington, D.C. Her work is distinguished by the shapes of the pottery and the designs. She made wide, low, rounded, shaped pottery and, in later years, tall jars. Many of her works are identifiable by her "recognizable designs" and "her artistic idiosyncrasies."

Nampeyo's photograph was often used on travel brochures for the American southwest.

Nampeyo began to lose her sight due to trachoma about the turn of the 20th century. From 1925 until her death she made pottery by touch and they were then painted by her husband, daughters or other family members.

In 2010, one of her artworks, a pot with a bulbous form with Hopi Kachina figures with "stylized faces" wearing "flamboyant black and burnt-umber headdresses" painted on "four sides of the pot"—sold for $350,000. Previous owners included Carter Harrison Jr. who was mayor of Chicago from 1911–1915, and Chicago's Cliff Dwellers art club, who received the work from Harrison in the 1930s.

Death and legacy

She died in 1942 at the home of her son Wesley and her daughter-in-law, Cecilia.

She was a symbol of the Hopi people and was a leader in the revival of ancient pottery. She inspired dozens of family members over several generations to make pottery, including daughters Fannie Nampeyo and Annie Healing. A 2014 exhibit at the Museum of Northern Arizona presents the works of four generations of artists descended from Nampeyo.

Public collections

 Arizona State Museum, University of Arizona
 Denver Art Museum, Colorado
 Kansas City Museum, Kansas City, MO
 Koshare Indian Museum, La Junta, CA
 Millicent Rogers Museum, Taos, NM
 Museum of Northern Arizona, Flagstaff, AZ
 National Museum of the American Indian, Smithsonian Institution, Washington, DC
 Peabody Museum of Archaeology and Ethnology, Harvard University, Cambridge, MA
 Union Station, Kansas City, MO
 Museum of Indian Arts and Culture/Laboratory of Anthropology, Santa Fe, NM
 Haffenreffer Museum of Anthropology at Brown University, Providence, RI

See also

 Fannie Nampeyo, daughter
 Daisy Hooee, granddaughter
 Elva Nampeyo, granddaughter
 Dextra Nampeyo Quotskuyva, great-granddaughter
 Priscilla Namingha, great-granddaughter
 Dan Namingha, great-great grandson
 Ida Sahmie, great-great daughter-in-law
 Nampeyo (crater), named to honor Nampeyo

References

Further reading
 Elmore, Steve. 2015. In Search of Nampeyo, Santa Fe, Spirit Bird Press and Steve Elmore Indian Art.
 
 Graves, Laura. Thomas Varker Keam, Indian Trader. Norman: University of Oklahoma Press, 1998. .
 Collins, John E. Nampeyo, Hopi Potter: Her Artistry and Her Legacy. Fullerton CA: Muckenthaler Cultural Center. 1974
 Rubenstein, Charlotte Streifer. American Women Artists: From Early Indian Times to the Present. New York: Avon, 1982.

External links

 Photographic Resources Guide to the North American Collection, Thomas Keam's Southwest Expedition
 Nampeyo – Hopi master potter

1859 births
1942 deaths
Hopi-Tewa people
Native American potters
American women ceramists
American ceramists
Artists from Arizona
20th-century American women artists
Native American women artists
Women potters
20th-century Native Americans
20th-century Native American women
19th-century Native American women
Native American people from Arizona